Raquel Peña de Antuña (born Raquel Peña Rodríguez; 10 September 1966) is a Dominican politician and academic who has served as Vice President of the Dominican Republic since 2020.

Early life and education
Peña was born in Santiago de los Caballeros, Dominican Republic, on 10 September 1966, to tobacco industrialist Rafael Leocadio Peña Guillén, a white Dominican, and Estela Rodríguez, a mixed-race Dominican woman.

She was educated primary at the Sagrado Corazón de Jesús School, and she studied secondary at the De La Salle School. She graduated from the Pontificia Universidad Católica Madre y Maestra.

Career
Peña started her career following her graduation, at the companies owned by her family. She became a manager at the tobacco and commercial companies.

Professor
In 2000, Peña became a professor of the Pontificia Universidad Católica Madre y Maestra.

Vice presidency
In 2019, Peña was chosen by Luis Abinader as vice-presidential candidate for the Modern Revolutionary Party in the 2020 elections. She won the election, along with Abinader, on 5 July 2020. Peña was sworn in on 16 August 2020.

Personal life
Peña was married to engineer Marco José Antuña Cabral, a white Dominican, great-great-great-grandson of French-Dominican Colonel Furcy Fondeur. They have three children and a grandson by their daughter. Her husband died in 2019.

References

1966 births
Pontificia Universidad Catolica Madre y Maestra alumni
Living people
Modern Revolutionary Party politicians
People from Santiago de los Caballeros
Academic staff of the Pontificia Universidad Católica Madre y Maestra
Vice presidents of the Dominican Republic
Women vice presidents
21st-century Dominican Republic women politicians
21st-century Dominican Republic politicians